Baron Howard of Escrick was a title in the Peerage of England. It was created on 12 April 1628 for Edward Howard. A member of the influential Howard family, he was the youngest son of Thomas Howard, 1st Earl of Suffolk, the son of Thomas Howard, 4th Duke of Norfolk by his second wife Margaret Audley (see Earl of Suffolk and Duke of Norfolk for more information). The third Baron represented Winchelsea in the House of Commons and was also accused of being involved in the Rye House Plot; later he became a notorious informer in State trials, earning much hatred and contempt as a result. The title became extinct on the death of his son, the fourth Baron, in 1715.

Barons Howard of Escrick (1628)
Edward Howard, 1st Baron Howard of Escrick (d. 1675)
Thomas Howard, 2nd Baron Howard of Escrick (1625–1678)
William Howard, 3rd Baron Howard of Escrick (d. 1694)
Charles Howard, 4th Baron Howard of Escrick (d. 1715)

See also
Duke of Norfolk
Earl of Suffolk

References 
 

1628 establishments in England
1715 disestablishments in England
Extinct baronies in the Peerage of England

Noble titles created in 1628